Yohanes Ferinando Pahabol, better known as Feri Pahabol, (born on 16 January 1992) is an Indonesian professional footballer who plays as a winger for Liga 1 club Persik Kediri.

International goals
Yohanes Pahabol: International under-23 goals

Personal life
Pahabol is a Christian who gives credit to Jesus for his success. His younger brother, Joshua, is also a professional player, who played for Persiraja in 2007.

In May 2016, Pahabol, along with teammates Roni Beroperay and Gerard Pangkali graduated from the Cenderawasih University in Jayapura with a Bachelor of Economics

Honours

Club
Persipura Jayapura
 Indonesia Super League: 2013
 Indonesia Soccer Championship A: 2016

International
Indonesia U-23
 Southeast Asian Games  Silver medal: 2013

References

External links
 
 Yohanes Pahabol at Liga Indonesia

1992 births
Living people
Indonesian Christians
Cenderawasih University alumni
People from Yahukimo Regency
Sportspeople from Papua
Indonesian footballers
Liga 1 (Indonesia) players
Persiwa Wamena players
Persidafon Dafonsoro players
Persipura Jayapura players
Persebaya Surabaya players
Kalteng Putra F.C. players
Persik Kediri players
Indonesia youth international footballers
Association football wingers
Association football forwards
Southeast Asian Games silver medalists for Indonesia
Southeast Asian Games medalists in football
Competitors at the 2013 Southeast Asian Games